Gary Reginald Whitney (born 19 March 1951 in Campbell Town, Tasmania) is a former cricketer who played for Tasmania. He was a right-handed batsman and right-arm fast-medium bowler who represented Tasmania from 1973 to 1979.

See also
 List of Tasmanian representative cricketers

External links
Cricinfo Profile

1951 births
Living people
Australian cricketers
Tasmania cricketers